Gingger Shankar is an American singer, composer and multi-instrumentalist.  She has scored several films, including Circumstance.

Early life
Shankar was born in Los Angeles, California and raised there and in India. She is the eldest daughter of violinist Dr. L. Subramaniam. Her mother, Viji Subramaniam, was a classical singer just like her grandmother Lakshmi Shankar, sister-in-law of noted sitarist Ravi Shankar. As a child, she learned to sing, dance, and play violin and piano and attended the Kalakshetra creative arts school in Chennai, Tamil Nadu. Later, she studied opera vocals with professional opera singer Tantoo Cardinal in Sherman Oaks, California. She also modeled and acted in stage productions. She began performing professionally at age 14.

Instruments
Shankar plays the violin, cello and piano. She is the only woman in the world to play the double violin. This ten-string, stereophonic instrument covers the entire orchestral range, including double bass, cello, viola and violin.

Career

Motion pictures
In 2004, she performed on the score of composer John Debney for the movie The Passion of the Christ.

She is also credited as a performer on the score the 2007 film Charlie Wilson's War, alongside composer James Newton Howard.

Shankar contributed to the 2008 film The Forbidden Kingdom.

She composed music for the 2011 film, Circumstance, which won the Sundance Audience Choice Award.

In 2012, she debuted her multi-media project Himalaya Song at the Sundance Film Festival. It was a project about climate change in the Himalayas with live film, narration and music created by Gingger, Mridu Chandra and Dave Liang of the Shanghai Restoration Project. It was chosen as one of the 10 Best Music Films at Sundance by Rolling Stone Magazine.

In May 2013, Monsoon Shootout, a thriller she scored for director Amit Kumar premiered at the Cannes Film Festival.

In 2014, Brahmin Bulls, a film she scored for director Mahesh Pailoor opened in the US. Starring Sendhil Ramamurthy, Roshan Seth and Mary Steenburgen, it won film festival awards.

In 2015, she composed the music for the virtual reality 'Project Syria' created by Nonny De La Peña which premiered at the Sundance Film Festival.

Musician
Shankar has performed in numerous festivals and venues alongside acts such as Smashing Pumpkins, Tony Levin, Steve Vai, Steve Lukather and Sussan Deyhim.

She performs on a track in the 2007 Saul Williams album Niggy Tardust, produced by Trent Reznor.

In July 2008, Shankar appeared in two Sgt. Pepper's 40th-anniversary concerts at the Hollywood Bowl.

On July 16, 2012, she appeared in the music video "Love All Humans" alongside guitarist Anthony Gallo, actress Kate Kelton, model Tara Bre and others.

In 2014, she performed at the George Fest in Los Angeles with the Flaming Lips honoring George Harrison. Other artists included Weird Al Yankovic, Brandon Flowers, Norah Jones, Dhani Harrison, Brian Wilson and more.

In 2014 she released music video cover of U2's Sunday Bloody Sunday directed by Nicholas Bruckman through Paste Magazine.

Discography

Original
2019: Article 15

Film scores
 2008: The Forbidden Kingdom
 2011: Circumstance
 2011: Homecoming Film
 2011: Bedouin
 2012: 419
 2012: Himalaya Song – Collaboration with Shanghai Restoration Project
 2013: Dose of Reality
 2013: The Missing Tomb National Geographic
 2013: Monsoon Shootout
 2014: Girl, Adopted Documentary
 2014: Brahmin Bulls
 2014: Water & Power
 2014: Katiyabaaz Documentary
 2014: Teacher in a Box- ITVS
 2016: AWOL 2016: Six LA Love Stories 2018: HeartbeatsMusic albums
 2003: Enlightenment – L. Shankar, Zakir Hussain, Vikku Vinayakram 2008: The Inevitable Rise and Liberation of NiggyTardust! – Saul Williams
 2010: Anywhere But Here'' – Solo EP

References

External links 
Official Website

Living people
Musicians from Los Angeles
American film score composers
Carnatic instrumentalists
Tamil musicians
Kalakshetra Foundation alumni
21st-century American composers
Singer-songwriters from California
American women musicians of Indian descent
American classical musicians of Indian descent
American people of Indian Tamil descent
Expatriate musicians in India
American expatriates in India
21st-century American violinists
Year of birth missing (living people)
21st-century classical composers